Yost may refer to:

Buildings 
Yost Ice Arena, the University of Michigan ice hockey arena
Yost Tavern, a historic building in Montgomery, Ohio
Yost Theater, a historic theater in Santa Ana, California

Places in the United States
Yost, Virginia, an unincorporated community
Yost, Utah, a ghost town

Other uses 
Yost (surname), a surname (including a list of people with this name)
Yošt, a character in Iranian mythology who defeated Axtya
Rollover cable, also called the Yost cable

See also 
 Jost, a German given name and surname